The 1996 WTA German Open was a women's tennis tournament played on outdoor clay courts at the Rot-Weiss Tennis Club in Berlin in Germany that was part of Tier I of the 1996 WTA Tour. It was the 27th edition of the tournament and was held from 13 May through 19 May 1996. First-seeded Steffi Graf won the singles title.

Finals

Singles

 Steffi Graf defeated  Karina Habšudová 4–6, 6–2, 7–5
 It was Graf's 3rd title of the year and the 109th of her career.

Doubles

 Meredith McGrath /  Larisa Savchenko defeated  Martina Hingis /  Helena Suková 6–1, 5–7, 7–6
 It was McGrath's 3rd title of the year and the 27th of her career. It was Neiland's 2nd title of the year and the 58th of her career.

References

External links
 ITF tournament edition details
 Tournament draws

WTA German Open
WTA German Open
1996 in German tennis